Shabana (Urdu/Pashto:شبانه) was a Pakistani singer and dancer from Mingora, Swat, Pakistan. She was shot and killed by the Pakistani Taliban of Swat in January 2009 at Mingora.

See also
 Women in Pakistan
 Malala Yousafzai
 Farida Afridi
 Ghazala Javed

References

2009 deaths
Pakistani women singers
Pakistani terrorism victims
Pashtun women
People from Swat District
People killed by the Taliban
Terrorism deaths in Pakistan
Year of birth missing
Deaths by firearm in Khyber Pakhtunkhwa